Civljane is a village and municipality in Šibenik-Knin County, Croatia. With only 239 inhabitants, it is the smallest municipality in Croatia by population. Civljane is an underdeveloped municipality which is statistically classified as the First Category Area of Special State Concern by the Government of Croatia.

History
In the 9th century, probably during the time of Duke Branimir of Croatia, the Church of Holy Salvation (Crkva sv. Spasa) was built in Cetina, near Vrlika, then called Vrh Rike. It is the only Croatian early medieval church with almost entirely preserved walls.

The Eastern Orthodox Church of Holy Salvation on the spring of the Cetina River was built in 1940, founded by Marko Četnik and his wife Jelena. The church was rebuilt in 1974.

Population
As of 2011, there are 188 Serbs, making up 78.7% of the population, and 44 Croats, making up 19.7% of the population, and 7 others. There are 216 Croatian speakers, and 4 Serbian speakers.

According to the 2011 census, the municipality had 239 inhabitants, situated in two villages:
 Cetina - 195
Civljane - 44

The average age of residents is 71, making Civljane the oldest municipality in Croatia.

Languages
Serbian Language, along with Serbian Cyrillic alphabet, is the second official language in the municipality alongside the Croatian language which is official in the whole country.

Geography
The municipality is located in the Dalmatian Hinterland, north of the town of Vrlika and Peruća Lake, on the field near the spring of Cetina River, on altitude of approximately 400 m, just under south base of mountain Dinara. The settlement of Civljane itself covers an area of 17.80 km2. Parts of the settlement are hamlets:

 Čitluk
 Dubrava pod Kozjakom
 Kotluša
 Kozjak
 Marjevci pod Kozjakom

See also
 Vrlika
 Glavaš - Dinarić Fortress
 Church of Holy Salvation
 Orthodox church of Holy Salvation

References

External links
 Official site

Municipalities of Croatia
Populated places in Šibenik-Knin County